The Comorian Democratic Union (UDC) was a political party in the Comoros.

History
The party was established in 1968, and was based mainly in Grande Comore. It became known as the "Green Party", as it used green ballots during elections.

In the cantonal elections in 1972, the UDC formed an alliance with the Democratic Rally of the Comorian People, winning 34 of the 39 seats.

References

Defunct political parties in the Comoros
1968 establishments in the Comoros
Political parties established in 1968